Places called Alphington include:
 Alphington, Devon, England
 Alphington, Victoria, Australia